Greenberry is an unincorporated community in Benton County, Oregon, United States. It is located on Oregon Route 99W about 8 miles south of Corvallis.

Greenberry was a station on the Westside line of the Southern Pacific Railroad (now owned by Portland and Western) named for Green Berry Smith, a pioneer of 1845 who came with the Meek party and settled in Benton County in 1846. He lived for a time on a farm in the area that bears his name. Smith was usually called Greenberry despite his two given names. Nearby Smith Hill is also named for him.

References

Unincorporated communities in Benton County, Oregon
Unincorporated communities in Oregon